The Turner–Chew–Carhart Farm, also known as the Jockey Hollow Farm, is a historic  farm located off Van Syckles Road in Union Township, Hunterdon County, New Jersey and near Clinton. It was added to the National Register of Historic Places on August 11, 1977, for its significance in agriculture, architecture, industry, and politics/government. The farmstead includes seven contributing buildings.

History
Joseph Turner (1701–1783) and William Allen (1704–1780), both from Philadelphia, built two iron forges in the area during the 1740s. The house was built for the nearby Union Forge and was intended as the residence for its superintendent. In 1784, Turner's niece, Elizabeth Oswald Chew, second wife of Benjamin Chew (1722–1810), inherited the farm. In 1833, Charles Carhart (1786–1863) purchased it from Samuel Chew.

Description
The early 19th century farmhouse is a two and one-half story frame building with a gambrel roof attached to an 18th-century one and one-half story frame building. It shows a restrained Greek Revival style, such as the sidelights and transom for the front door. There is a dormer in the gambrel roof. The original 18th-century building was likely altered and expanded  by Carhart.

Museum
In 2012, the Union Forge Heritage Association established the Solitude Heritage Museum in the farmhouse at 117 Van Syckles Road, named the 1760 Joseph Turner House.

The Forge Masters house for the Union Forge is also located nearby, off Van Syckles Road toward High Bridge.

See also
 National Register of Historic Places listings in Hunterdon County, New Jersey
 List of museums in New Jersey

References

External links
 
 

Union Township, Hunterdon County, New Jersey
National Register of Historic Places in Hunterdon County, New Jersey
Houses on the National Register of Historic Places in New Jersey
New Jersey Register of Historic Places
Greek Revival houses in New Jersey